Maxwell Jacob Friedman (MJF) is an American professional wrestler.

MJF may also refer to:

 Madheshi Jana Adhikar Forum, Nepal
 Madheshi Jana Adhikar Forum, Nepal (Loktantrik)
 Michael J. Fox (born 1961), Canadian-American actor
 Mosjøen Airport (IATA: MJF), an airport in Kjærstad, Norway